Tangerang may refer to:
 Tangerang City, a city in Banten
 Tangerang Regency, a regency in Banten
 South Tangerang, a city which formerly included to Tangerang Regency